James M. Campbell was an American politician from Stevens Point, Wisconsin who was elected in the fall of 1847 to serve a single one-year term as a Democratic member of the Wisconsin State Assembly representing Portage County in the 1st Wisconsin Legislature of 1848. He was succeeded by fellow Democrat John Delaney. In January of 1847, he'd been appointed as a notary public. In December of 1847, he was serving as tax collector for the county.

References 

19th-century American politicians
People from Stevens Point, Wisconsin
Tax collectors
Wisconsin local politicians
Democratic Party members of the Wisconsin State Assembly